John the Prophet, known also as Venerable John, was the abbot of the monastery of Merosala and teacher of Dorotheus of Gaza.

He practiced a life of silence and according to the Christian view earned the gifts of prophecy and perspicacity, for which he received the designation of prophet. During 18 years, up to his death, he was close to Barsanuphius of Palestine, with whom he exchanged letters. According to Church tradition he knew the date of his demise and in response to Abba Elianus' request he postponed his death for two weeks in order to instruct him how to run the cloister. The feast day of John the prophet is marked by Eastern Orthodox Church on February, 6 (Old style).

References

Egyptian hermits
Prophets
Year of birth unknown